Hunda is an uninhabited island in the Orkney archipelago in Scotland. It is situated in Scapa Flow and connected to the nearby island of Burray by a causeway built in 1941 to stop passage of small surface craft as part of the boom defences, and thence to the Orkney Mainland via the Churchill Barriers.

The name is derived from the Old Norse for 'dog island'. The Vikings made the Orkney Islands  their headquarters for their expeditions against Scotland and Norway, and the islands were under the rule of Norse earls until 1231. The island is rich in bird life, and contains a disused quarry. A small inlet in the northern cliffs is known as 'Sunless Geo'.

Hunda is currently used to raise sheep and goats for wool.

See also
 List of Orkney islands

References

External links

Uninhabited islands of Orkney